Rantanen is a Finnish surname meaning "small shore". Notable people with the surname include:

Anssi Rantanen (born 1982), Finnish ice hockey player
Eelis Rantanen (1879–1946), Finnish schoolteacher and politician
Heli Rantanen (born 1970), Finnish javelin thrower
Jari Rantanen (born 1961), Finnish footballer
Kaarlo Rantanen (born 1988), Finnish footballer
Marko Rantanen (born 1975), Finnish ice hockey goaltender
Mari Rantanen, Finnish politician
Matti Rantanen (accordionist) (born 1952), Finnish accordionist
Matti Rantanen (rally driver) (born 1981), Finnish rally driver
Merja Rantanen (born 1980), Finnish orienteering competitor
Mikko Rantanen (born 1996), Finnish ice hockey player, forward for the Colorado Avalanche
Paavo Rantanen (born 1934), former Finnish Foreign Ministry official, who was briefly the Minister of Foreign Affairs
Pasi Rantanen (born 1969), Finnish singer for the band Thunderstone
Piritta Rantanen (born 1979), Finnish politician
Siiri Rantanen (born 1924), Finnish cross-country skier
Vesa Rantanen (born 1975), Finnish pole vaulter
Yrjö Rantanen (born 1950), Finnish chess grandmaster

Finnish-language surnames